In the Kalevala, the Finnish national epic, Ilmatar was a virgin spirit and goddess of the air.

Origins
The name Ilmatar is derived from the Finnish word ilma, meaning "air," and the female suffix -tar, corresponding to English "-ress". Thus, her name means Airress. In the Kalevala she was also occasionally called Luonnotar, which means "female spirit of nature" (Finnish luonto, "nature").

She was impregnated by the sea and wind and thus became the mother of Väinämöinen.

Sibelius’s Luonnotar

Jean Sibelius composed the tone poem Luonnotar, for soprano and orchestra in 1913. In this work, the mythical origin of the land and sky, recounted in craggy verses from the Kalevala, becomes an intense Sibelian metaphor for the inexorable force—even the terror of all creation—including that of the artist. One of the composer's most compelling works, it alternates between two musical ideas. As heard at the outset, these are the shimmering stirrings of ever-growing possibility; and, underpinned with dissonant, static, harp strokes, the even more incantatory, distressed cries of the "nature spirit" (Luonnotar) herself, heavy with child.

Homage
 Ilmatar is an album by the Finnish band Värttinä, released in 2000. Its theme was inspired by the goddess's origin-story in the Kalevala and similar Finnish folk-lore and magic.
 The Main Belt asteroid 385 Ilmatar is named after the goddess.
 In the book The Quantum Thief, members of a humanoid race living in the Oort cloud sometimes pray to Kuutar and Ilmatar.
Tales Eldelórne trilogy by Karleigh Bon, book one, introduces Ilmatar as the "womb of their gods, where immortal elves are reborn". 2014-2019
 One of the protagonists of the anime Strike Witches, Finnish aviator Eila Ilmatar Juutilainen, shares part of her name with that of the goddess.

References

Finnish goddesses
Finnish gods
Sky and weather goddesses
Characters in the Kalevala